Otothyris travassosi is a species of armored catfish endemic to Brazil, where it occurs in the coastal streams of the southeast. This species grows to a length of  SL.

The fish is named in honor of Haroldo P. Travassos (1922-1977) of the Museu Nacional of Brazil, for his contributions to Brazilian ichthyology and assistance with the authors’ studies of fish.

References
 

Otothyrinae
Fish of South America
Fish of Brazil
Endemic fauna of Brazil
Taxa named by Júlio César Garavello
Taxa named by Heraldo Antonio Britski
Taxa named by Scott Allen Schaefer
Fish described in 1998